Spodoptera peruviana is a moth of the family Noctuidae. It is found South America, including Peru.

Spodoptera
Moths described in 1865